Cheviot  is a city in west-central Hamilton County, Ohio, United States. It is a suburb of Cincinnati. The population was 8,658 at the 2020 census.

History

He built an inn and tavern on the Harrison Pike. On March 21 1818, Craig laid out a town which he named after the Cheviot Hills in southern Scotland. He sold lots and growth began.

The town was incorporated as a village in 1901, and a city in 1931. Originally a farming community, today Cheviot is a residential suburb of Cincinnati.

On January 6, 2018, fireworks at the Cheviot Memorial Building Fieldhouse kicked off the city's bicentennial. Events planned throughout 2018 included a new water splash park at Harvest Home Park, a historical marker at Harvest Home and personal bricks located next to the cannon at the Memorial Building on Robb Avenue. In March 2018, members of the Cheviot Bicentennial Committee decided to restart the Cheviot Historical Society together with Cheviot History  to preserve the history of Cheviot.

Geography

Climate

Demographics

2020 census
As of the census of 2020, there were 8,658 people and 4,272 households living in the city. The racial makeup of the city was 71.1% White, 20.8% African American, 0.3% Native American, 0.6% Asian, 1.4% from other races, and 5.8% from two or more races. Hispanic or Latino of any race were 2.6% of the population.

2010 census
As of the census of 2010, there were 8,375 people, 3,779 households, and 1,931 families living in the city. The racial makeup of the city was 89.0% White, 7.3% African American, 0.2% Native American, 0.5% Asian, 0.9% from other races, and 2.1% from two or more races. Hispanic or Latino of any race were 2.0% of the population.

There were 3,779 households, of which 27.0% had children under the age of 18 living with them, 31.1% were married couples living together, 14.8% had a female householder with no husband present, 5.2% had a male householder with no wife present, and 48.9% were non-families. 39.6% of all households were made up of individuals, and 11.3% had someone living alone who was 65 years of age or older. The average household size was 2.18 and the average family size was 2.96.

The median age in the city was 34.6 years. 21.8% of residents were under the age of 18; 9.4% were between the ages of 18 and 24; 31.3% were from 25 to 44; 24.1% were from 45 to 64; and 13.3% were 65 years of age or older. The gender makeup of the city was 48.2% male and 51.8% female.

2000 census
As of the census of 2000, there were 9,015 people, 4,064 households, and 2,202 families living in the city. The population density was 7,753.5 people per square mile (3,000.6/km2). There were 4,338 housing units at an average density of 3,731.0 per square mile (1,443.9/km2). The racial makeup of the city was 96.93% White, 0.79% African American, 0.18% Native American, 0.62% Asian, 0.01% Pacific Islander, 0.49% from other races, and 0.99% from two or more races. Hispanic or Latino of any race were 1.11% of the population.

There were 4,064 households, out of which 26.9% had children under the age of 18 living with them, 39.1% were married couples living together, 10.9% had a female householder with no husband present, and 45.8% were non-families. 40.0% of all households were made up of individuals, and 15.6% had someone living alone who was 65 years of age or older. The average household size was 2.17 and the average family size was 2.97.

In the city, the population was spread out, with 22.4% under the age of 18, 8.5% from 18 to 24, 33.7% from 25 to 44, 17.7% from 45 to 64, and 17.8% who were 65 years of age or older. The median age was 36 years. For every 100 females, there were 88.9 males. For every 100 females age 18 and over, there were 84.7 males.

The median income for a household in the city was $35,150, and the median income for a family was $48,947. Males had a median income of $36,886 versus $28,202 for females. The per capita income for the city was $19,686. About 5.2% of families and 7.6% of the population were below the poverty line, including 11.4% of those under age 18 and 5.8% of those age 65 or over.

Government

Past Mayors
Henry Fischer (R) 1901
Fred Edward Wesselman (R) 1902-1905
Christian Ferdinand (Ferd)  Baechle (R) 1905-1911
Fred Henry Altemeier (R) 1912-1917
Clifford Harry Hay (R) 1918-1941
Edward Christian Gingerich (D) 1942-1967
Albert William Schottelkotte (D) 1967
Donald Paul Bennett (R) 1968-1971
Louis Edgar Von Holle (D) 1972-1983
John Michael (Mike) Laumann (D) 1983-2003
Samuel David Keller (D) 2004-

Culture
The city of Cheviot is home to much of the same German-American and other ethnic cultures that inhabit the surrounding Cincinnati area. The city is known locally (and regionally) for its annual Harvest Home Fair. Since about 1855, the fair has been held each year on the weekend after Labor Day. The city incorporated the West Fest Street Festival in 2002, which has steadily grown in popularity.  The annual event features local food, various booths/activities, children's rides, and live music. Cheviot is often recognized by locals as "The Heart of The West Side" (of Cincinnati) because of its urban yet small-town, friendly culture. The city features a concentrated variety of small businesses and pubs along its main thoroughfares. The city is part of the Cincinnati Public School district.

Religious Organizations/Churches
Cheviot United Methodist Church (UMC)
One Accord Christian Church (Non-Denominational)
St. Martin of Tours (RCC)
Vineyard Westside (Vineyard USA)
Cheviot for Jesus (interdenominational)
Cheviot Christian Communion
Cincinnati Word of Faith Church

Notable people
 Dorothy Mueller, baseball player
 Glenn Ryle, WKRC-TV Personality; host of "Skipper Ryle" and later Bowling For Dollars
 Al Schottelkotte, WCPO TV news anchor (1959-1994)
 Andy Williams, singer and television personality
 Steve Tensi, former professional football quarterback

References

External links
 City website

Cities in Hamilton County, Ohio
Populated places established in 1818
Scottish-American culture in Ohio
Cities in Ohio
1818 establishments in Ohio